Ma Siju was a Chinese pianist, cellist, and Dean of Central Conservatory of Music, China's leading music school.

Early life 
On April 25, 1920, Ma was born as Ma Siju in Haifeng county in Guangdong Province, China. Ma's father was Ma Yuhang. Ma's father was a finance minister of Guangdong, China. Ma's older brother was Ma Sicong (b.1912). Ma's other siblings include brother Ma Sihong (b. 1923), Ma Sisun, and sister Ma Siyun.

Ma started learning piano when she was 10 years old. In 1934, Ma moved to Shanghai with her family.

Ma's brother Ma Sicong, a composer, gave her music lessons while he taught in the music department at National Central University in Nanking. Ma accepted Ma Sicong's advice and starting learning cello.

In 1936, Ma's father was transferred, and she moved back to Guangdong Province with her parents and younger sister, Ma Siyun. There she continued studying music. In 1937, after the Marco Polo Bridge Incident, her family moved to Hong Kong, but she never stopped playing piano and cello. Her piano teacher was Latvian musician Harry Ore, and her cello teacher was Italian musician Pelligatti. She worked well with both instructors, and improved quickly, especially on the piano.

On January 29, 1939, Ma's father was assassinated in Shanghai, China.

Career 
In 1938, at Harry Ore's recommendation, Ma Siju auditioned to perform for BBC World Service in Hong Kong, and was accepted. She performed once every two months, giving her ample opportunity to improve her musical skills.

In 1943, Ma accepted Zhao Meibo's invitation to teach cello and piano in Xi'an Northwestern Musical College. She also held concerts there. Later, after WWII, Ma was hired by Qingmuguan National Musical College to teach piano and cello, as well as sight reading and solfège. When the college later relocated to the south, Ma Siju served as concertmaster for the Shanghai Town Hall Orchestra and the Nanjing Zhonghua Symphony Orchestra. At the  same, she studied piano with Russian musician Denys Proshayev.

In 1948, Ma became the Vice President and Dean of the Music Department of the China-Soviet Union Amateur Dancing College. During this period, Ma taught classes and organized performing tours. Ma also performed in the tours as pianist and cellist.

In 1954, Ma became the Dean of the Piano Department at Central Conservatory of Music, where she taught piano. In 1957, Ma taught cello in the Orchestra Department of Central Conservatory of Music.

On July 26, 1961, Ma joined the Chinese Communist Party.

In 1986, Ma retired from Central Conservatory of Music.

Personal life
Ma's husband was Wang Tan, a Chinese architect. 
Ma had a daughter, Zhen-Mei Wang, and the family lived in Suzhou. Ma gave her daughter musical lessons. In 1948, Ma and her family moved to Northeastern liberated region of China.

Ma's daughter Zhen-Mei Wang is a professional pianist, instructor and reference librarian.

Ma's brother Ma Sicong had lived a low profile life in the United States before his death in Philadelphia, Pennsylvania in May 1987.

On October 13, 2014, Ma died from an illness in Beijing, China. She was 94.

Achievement 
Publishing "Amateur Piano Practice Composition."

Translating "Casas and His Art."

Co- translating with her colleague Ah Baza "Chorus Knowledge and Conducting."

See also 
 Ma Sicong

References 

1920 births
2014 deaths
Chinese classical pianists
Chinese classical cellists
Women classical cellists
People from Haifeng County
Musicians from Guangdong
Educators from Guangdong
Writers from Shanwei
People's Republic of China musicians